Vadsø is a  municipality in Troms og Finnmark County, Norway. The administrative centre of the municipality is the town of Vadsø, which was the administrative centre of the former Finnmark county. Other settlements in Vadsø include Ekkerøy, Kiby, Krampenes, Skallelv, Valen, and Vestre Jakobselv.

The  municipality is the 83rd largest by area out of the 356 municipalities in Norway. Vadsø is the 170th most populous municipality in Norway with a population of 5,568.

General information

The village of Vadsø was granted town status in 1833. In 1838, the town of Vadsø and the entire rural district surrounding the Varangerfjorden were established as the new municipality of Vadsø (see formannskapsdistrikt law). The law required that all towns should be separated from their rural districts, but because of a low population and very few voters, this was impossible to carry out for the municipality of Vadsø in 1838. (This was also true in the towns of Hammerfest and Vardø.)

In 1839, the western district (population: 598) was separated to become the new municipality of Nesseby. This left Vadsø with 388 residents. In 1858, Vadsø municipality changed again: Nesseby Municipality (population: 706) was merged back into Vadsø and the district of Vadsø located south of the Varangerfjorden (population: 1,171) was separated to form the new municipality of Sør-Varanger. This change resulted in a population of 2,050 in Vadsø municipality. In 1864, the western district of Nesseby (population: 866) was separated into a separate municipality once again, leaving Vadsø with 1,367 residents.

On 1 January 1894, the rest of the rural district (population: 1,296) surrounding the town of Vadsø was separated to form the new municipality of Nord-Varanger. This left just the town of Vadsø remaining in the municipality of Vadsø which now had 1,114 residents. During the 1960s, there were many municipal mergers across Norway due to the work of the Schei Committee. On 1 January 1964, the municipality of Nord-Varanger (population: 1,587) was merged with the town of Vadsø (population: 3,353) to form the present-day Vadsø Municipality.

On 1 January 2020, the municipality became part of the newly formed Troms og Finnmark county. Previously, it had been part of the old Finnmark county.

Name
The municipality is named after the town of Vadsø. The name of the town comes from the island Vadsøya, since that was the original townsite. The Old Norse form of the name would be *Vazøy, *Vatsøy, *Vassøy; the eldest references to the town show the forms Vasthøen (1520) and Vaadsøenn (1567). The first element is the genitive case of vatn which means "water" and the last element is øy which means "island". Therefore, the meaning of the name is "the island with drinking water".

Coat of arms
The coat of arms was granted on 20 February 1976. The official blazon is "Gules, a reindeer's head couped argent". This means the arms have a red field (background) and the charge is the head of a reindeer stag. The reindeer head has a tincture of argent which means it is commonly colored white, but if it is made out of metal, then silver is used. Reindeer husbandry is common in the municipality and of great economic importance, especially important among the Sámi population. The reindeer also symbolizes freedom, strength, and endurance. The arms were designed by Hallvard Trætteberg.

Churches
The Church of Norway has one parish within the municipality of Vadsø. It is part of the Varanger prosti (deanery) in the Diocese of Nord-Hålogaland.

History
In the 16th century, the settlement of Vadsø consisted of a fishing village and the old Vadsø Church, located on the island of Vadsøya. The settlement later moved to the mainland. Pomor trade led Vadsø to be a major trading centre in this part of Norway. Township privilege was granted in 1833, and soon settlers came from Finland and the northern part of Sweden, which suffered from famine.

Finnish was rapidly becoming the language of the majority, and this continued for decades. As of 2016, Finnish is still spoken in some households. During the occupation of Norway by Nazi Germany, Vadsø suffered several air raids from the Soviet Union, which bombed German troops. However, there are, unlike most places in Finnmark, a number of 19th century wooden houses preserved close to the city centre, notably the house of Esbensen, built by a Norwegian, and the house of Tuomainen, built by a Finn. On the island of Vadsøya is the airship mast used by Umberto Nobile and Roald Amundsen for their expedition over the North Pole with the airship Norge in 1926, and used again on Nobile's flight with the airship Italia in 1928.

Government
All municipalities in Norway, including Vadsø, are responsible for primary education (through 10th grade), outpatient health services, senior citizen services, unemployment and other social services, zoning, economic development, and municipal roads. The municipality is governed by a municipal council of elected representatives, which in turn elect a mayor.  The municipality falls under the Øst-Finnmark District Court and the Hålogaland Court of Appeal.

Municipal council
The municipal council  of Vadsø is made up of 21 representatives that are elected to four year terms. The party breakdown of the council is as follows:

Mayors
The mayors of Vadsø:

c.1860–1891: Vilhelm Andersen 
1892–1894: Nikolai Prebensen (H)
1922–1923: Johan Grønvigh 
1924–1925: Jakob Laurits Smith Bredrup  
1926–1927: August Absalon Trasti (Ap)
1928-1929: Terje Wold (Ap)
1929–1931: August Absalon Trasti (Ap)
1932-1932: Richard Rasmussen 
1933-1933: Andreas Brodtkorb Esbensen 
1934–1936: Terje Wold (Ap)
1937-1945: Magnus Methi (Ap)
1953–1959: Anders Aune (Ap)
1962–1963: Jarle Johansen (Ap)
1964–1972: Henry Nikolai Karlsen (Ap)
1972-1979: Roger Hans Jenssen 
1980–1983: Paul Rudolf Basma (Ap)
1984–1995: Aage Noren (Ap)
1995-2003: Anne Strifeldt (Ap)
2003-2007: Hauk Henrik Johnsen (Ap)
2007-2013: Svein Dragnes (Ap)
2014-2015: Rolf Arne Hanssen (SV)
2015-2019: Hans-Jacob Bønå (H)
2019–present: Wenche Pederson (Ap)

Geography

The municipality of Vadsø forms the southern coast of the Varanger Peninsula. The treeline lies at 100 m - 200 m ASL, highest at sheltered areas into the fjord away from the sea. There is no conifer forest in the municipality, the treeline is made up of birch forest, and willow shrubs are also common. The Varangerfjorden lies along the southern coast of the municipality and the river Jakobselva runs along the western border of Vadsø. The small islands of Lille Ekkerøy and Vadsøya lie in the Varangerfjorden. The Varangerhalvøya National Park lies in a large part of the interior parts of the municipality. The "midnight sun" is above the horizon from 17 May to 28 July (73 days), and the period with continuous daylight lasts a bit longer, polar night from 25 November to 17 January (54 days).

Climate
Vadsø town has a subarctic climate, with long winters and a cool short summer. Part of the municipality is upland at the Varanger peninsula with alpine tundra climate above the treeline.

Wildlife

Birdlife
Situated on the shores of the Varangerfjorden the municipality of Vadsø is known for its interesting birdlife. Many of its coastal localities like Store Ekkerøy are internationally known for its rich and interesting birdlife. The harbor at Vadsø can produce all three species of eider, including the small and stunning Steller's eider.

River fishing
Fishing permits (for salmon fishing) are sold for use on specific rivers, including Komag-elva.

Transportation

Vadsø Airport is located in Kiby, just to the east of the town. The town is also a port of call for the Hurtigruten coastal express boats. Vadsø is located along the European route E75 highway.

Economy
The service industries have more impact on employment than the total of farming, fishing and the manufacturing industry. The city has suppliers to the regional construction industries, including a concrete works. One bookstore exists.

Notable people

 Mathias Bonsach Krogh (1754 in Vadsø – 1828) a clergyman, first Bishop of Hålogaland
 Sigurd Kloumann (1879 in Vadsø – 1953) a Norwegian engineer and hydropower developer
 Terje Wold (1899 – 1972) Mayor of Vadsø in the 1930s & the 15th Chief Justice of the Supreme Court 1958 to 1969
 Anders John Aune (1923 – 2011) a Norwegian politician, Mayor of Vadsø in the 1950s
 Einar Niemi (born 1943 in Nord-Varanger) historian of the cultural heritage of Northern Norway
 Harald Norvik (born 1946 in Vadsø) former CEO of Statoil, Telenor & ConocoPhillips
 Bodil Niska (born 1954 in Vadsø) a Norwegian jazz musician, plays the saxophone
 Harald Devold (1964–2016) a Norwegian jazz musician, lived in Vadsø from 1995 
 Stig Henrik Hoff (born 1965 in Vadsø) a Norwegian actor 
 Ingvild Aleksandersen (born 1968 in Vadsø) a Norwegian lawyer; County Governor of Finnmark county 2016 to 2018

Sport 
 Aage Steen (1900 in Vadsø – 1982) a boxer who competed in the 1920 Summer Olympics
 Lars Bohinen (born 1969 in Vadsø) a former professional footballer with 355 club caps and 49 for Norway
 Sigurd Rushfeldt (born 1972 in Vadsø) a football coach and former player with 485 club caps and 38 for Norway
 Morten Gamst Pedersen (born 1981 in Vadsø) a professional footballer with over 500 club caps and 83 for Norway

International relations

Twin towns — Sister cities
Vadsø is twinned with the following cities:
 – Holstebro, Denmark
 – Karkkila, Finland
 – Kemijärvi, Finland
 – Murmansk, Russia
 – Oxelösund, Sweden

References

External links

Municipal fact sheet from Statistics Norway 
Varanger.com: tourist information about Varanger area
List of town twinnings in Scandinavia 

 
Municipalities of Troms og Finnmark
Populated places established in 1838
Populated places of Arctic Norway
1838 establishments in Norway